Jérémy Chartier (born 2001) is a Canadian trampoline gymnast from Montreal, Quebec. Chartier is the reigning Pan American Games Champion having won gold in 2019 in Lima, Peru. Following his victory in Peru, Chartier said that "I was pretty nervous. I am not going to lie, those are not the best trampolines I have ever jumped on. But I think everyone had a solid routine. It was a really tight competition."

References

2001 births
Living people
Canadian male trampolinists
Gymnasts at the 2018 Summer Youth Olympics
Gymnasts at the 2019 Pan American Games
Gymnasts from Montreal
Pan American Games gold medalists for Canada
Pan American Games medalists in gymnastics
Medalists at the 2019 Pan American Games
21st-century Canadian people